Suburra is a 2015 Italian neo-noir crime film directed by Stefano Sollima, based on the 2013 novel of the same name by Carlo Bonini and Giancarlo De Cataldo. The movie was financed by Netflix and RAI. It stars Pierfrancesco Favino, Elio Germano and Claudio Amendola, and focuses on the connections between organized crime and politics in Rome in 2011, inspired by true events from the Mafia Capitale. Suburra was the name of a suburb of Ancient Rome.

In 2017, Netflix released an adaptation of the movie in the form of a television series, Suburra: Blood on Rome.

Plot 
In November 2011, Filippo Malgradi is an Italian MP involved in a bill to change the classification of certain administrative areas; his objective is to allow a real estate project in Ostia so that it could be turned into a Las Vegas-like city. He has close relations with a local crime boss—known as "Samurai", a former militant neo-fascist terrorist turned professional criminal under the cover of an unsuspecting pump station owner—who also has deep interests in the real estate project. Samurai has privileged ties to the Vatican Bank, who will finance the project for profit.

At a hotel room, Filippo fraternizes with two prostitutes, Sabrina and Jelena; Jelena, who is underage, dies of intoxication. When Filippo runs away as he attempts to dispose of the body with the other prostitute, she calls Alberto "Spadino" Anacleti to help dispose of the body by dumping it into a reservoir.

Spadino is from a gypsy family who made a fortune by violent means as money lenders and debt collectors. They lent money to Sebastiano's father, a pimp who organises secret parties in his family villa for important members of the Italian high society. Sebastiano's father commits suicide after being unable to pay his debts, and Manfredi Anacleti, the patriarch of the Anacleti family, summons Sebastiano to convince him to relinquish all his property to pay for his father's debts.

Spadino decides to blackmail Filippo into purchasing drugs and prostitutes from him and his family. Filippo asks Aureliano "Numero 8" Adami to intimidate Spadino, but the confrontation becomes more violent than expected, and Aureliano kills Spadino leaving Manfredi Anacleti infuriated and thirsty for revenge.

Aureliano is a local thug who controls the target of the real estate project permitted by the bill in discussion. His father was also a criminal and a close friend of Samurai. He has agreed with Samurai a division in profits as long as he convinces local small business owners to sell their properties at a bargain to Samurai. Aureliano is in love with a drug-addict named Viola.

Sabrina, fearing for her life, asks Sebastiano for help, and he lets her stay at his house. She reveals the name of Spadino'''s killer to him, and he then decides to tell Manfredi in exchange for clemency and his family's villa. Anacleti's henchman unsuccessfully attempt to kill Aureliano. Fearful that an all-out war between Aureliano and Manfredi could threaten his real estate interests, Samurai decides to intervene between the two to bring peace. In the meantime Manfredi learns about the real estate project and also wants his share in the business.

Manfredi blackmails Sebastiano to hand him over the prostitute Sabrina; in turn, Sabrina tells Manfredi Anacleti the name of the politician who is behind the project, which she reveals to be Filippo. Manfredi bursts into Filippo's apartment and takes his son as a hostage, demanding a participation in the business. Filippo, enraged, asks Samurai for protection. Samurai, who does not want to lose the transaction, attempts to reason with Aureliano, but the latter tells Samurai that "he is old and outdated". Samurai, offended by Aureliano's words and also fearful that the Vatican would back down on financing the project, decides to kill him and his henchmen. During the shooting, Viola hides and manages to escape. He decides to share the profits only with Manfredi.

Manfredi goes back on his promise to return the family villa to Sebastiano, and severely beats Sebastiano. The bill is also approved, but the body of Jelena is found on the shore and Filippo is warned that the judiciary may investigate him. Meanwhile, Sebastiano, enraged, assaults Manfredi when he arrives home at night, beats him, and locks him in the cage of Manfredi's own ferocious pit bull, who mauls him to death. After the approval of the bill, the Prime Minister resigns from office, which jeopardizes Filippo's parliamentary immunity, potentially leaving him at the mercy of the Judiciary system. Finally, Samurai is killed by Viola while leaving his mother's apartment.

 Cast 
 Pierfrancesco Favino as Filippo Malgradi
 Elio Germano as Sebastiano
 Claudio Amendola as "Samurai"
 Alessandro Borghi as Aureliano "Numero 8" Adami
 Greta Scarano as Viola
 Giulia Elettra Gorietti as Sabrina
 Adamo Dionisi as Manfredi Anacleti
 Giacomo Ferrara as Alberto "Spadino" Anacleti
 Antonello Fassari as Sebastiano's father
 Jean-Hugues Anglade as Cardinal Berchet
 Nazzareno Bomba as "Bacarozzo"
 Marco Zangardi as Rognati
 Yulia Kolomiets as Jelena

Critical response
Box office
The film made €1,742,182 in its opening weekend in Italy, totaling €4.7 million in Italy, for a grand total of $5.1 million including the international box office.

ReceptionSuburra was well received by critics. It currently holds a 92% approval rating on review aggregation website Rotten Tomatoes, based on 22 reviews with an average rating of 7.3/10. Lee Marshall of Screen International and Jacob Stolworthy of The Independent praised the film for its casting, filming and soundtrack. Hanh Nguyen of IndieWire'' stated, "While it delivered shocks and spectacle, its characterizations felt shallow and stereotypical — probably because it tried to pack too much into its 130-minute runtime."

See also   
 List of Italian films of 2015

References

External links 

2015 crime films
Films directed by Stefano Sollima
Films set in 2011
Films set in Rome
French crime films
Italian crime films
Italian neo-noir films
Films about organized crime in Italy
French neo-noir films
Films based on non-fiction books about organized crime
Crime films based on actual events
2010s French films
2010s Italian-language films